Still Burning is the second solo studio album by Mike Scott, released by Chrysalis in 1997. It followed Scott's 1995 solo debut, Bring 'em All In, and was the last of Scott's solo albums before re-forming The Waterboys in 2000. Photography was provided by Andrew Catlin and Mary Scanlon. Although well-received critically, sales of the album were poor and Scott was subsequently dropped from Chrysalis Records. This led directly to Scott's decision to revive the Waterboys' name in order to achieve wider marketplace exposure. Scott describes the making of and commercial failure of the album in detail in his 2012 autobiography, Adventures of a Waterboy.

The songs "Love Anyway" and "Rare, Precious and Gone" were released as singles. The video for the latter (available to view on YouTube) is notable for having been filmed in a booth at an airport that cost £5.00 to operate while Scott and his band were waiting to board a flight, potentially making it one of the lowest costing filmed music videos ever produced.

Track listing
FIRST ISSUE (1997) 

All songs by Mike Scott.

 "Questions" – 4:49 
 "My Dark Side" – 3:57 
 "Open" – 2:54 
 "Love Anyway" – 6:41 
 "Rare, Precious and Gone" – 4:05 
 "Dark Man of My Dreams" – 4:15 
 "Personal" – 2:14 
 "Strawberry Man" – 3:30 
 "Sunrising" – 4:58 
 "Everlasting Arms" – 2:52

Later editions have a revised track list. The 1998 US release on Steady Records features all 14 songs listed below, while the 1997 Japanese release has 12 tracks, missing "One of Many Rescuers" and "Man on the Mountain".

 "Questions" – 4:49 
 "My Dark Side" – 3:57 
 "Open" – 2:54 
 "Love Anyway" – 6:41 
 "Rare, Precious and Gone" – 4:05 
 "Dark Man of My Dreams" – 4:15 
 "King Electric" – 7:18 
 "Personal" – 2:14 
 "One of Many Rescuers" (US release only) – 4:52
 "Strawberry Man" – 3:30 
 "Man on the Mountain" (US release only) – 4:00
 "Sunrising" – 4:58 
 "Everlasting Arms" – 2:52 
 "Since I Found My School" – 3:01

Personnel
 Chris Bruce – guitar, electric guitar
 James Hallawell – Hammond organ, wurlitzer
 Bill Hawkes – viola
 Preston Heyman – percussion
 Steve Holley – drums
 Paul Kegg - cello
 Jim Keltner – drums, tambourine, shaker
 Martin Loveday – cello
 Ian McNabb – background vocals
 Perry Montague-Mason – violin
 Pino Palladino – bass guitar
 Mike Scott – vocals, guitar
 Brian Stanley – bass
 Gavyn Wright – violin
 Denise Johnson - Backing Vocals

Charts

References

External links
Lyrics at mikescottwaterboys.com
Official forum Chord requests are often fulfilled at "Musician's Corner"
Follow-up interview with Rolling Stone

1997 albums
Mike Scott (musician) albums
Albums produced by Niko Bolas
Chrysalis Records albums